Silke is a Germanic female given name originally derived from Latin. There are two separate meanings:

Silke is a Frisian diminutive form of Cecilia, from the Roman family name Caecilius
Silke is also a German diminutive form of Celia, meaning "heavenly", from the Latin "caelum" meaning "heaven".

Those bearing it include:
 Silke Ackermann, German historian of science and museum curator
 Silke Aichhorn, German harpist
 Silke Bull, an East German sprint canoer who competed in the early 1990s. She won a gold medal in the K-4 500 m event at the 1990 ICF
 Silke Hörmann, German sprint canoer who has competed since the mid-2000s. She won a silver medal in the K-4 1000 m event in 2006
 Silke Kraushaar-Pielach (born 1970), German luge racer.
 Silke Meier (born 1968), German tennis player
 Silke Möller (born 1964), German track and field athlete
 Silke Rottenberg (born 1972), German football goalkeeper
 Silke Schwarz, German wheelchair fencer
 Silke Vanwynsberghe (born 1997), Belgian footballer

German feminine given names